Tu Dongxu (born 13 November 1991) is a Chinese footballer who plays for China League One side Heilongjiang Ice City.

Club career
Tu Dongxu started his professional football career in 2010 when he was promoted to Guangzhou Evergrande's squad for the 2010 China League One campaign. On 18 July 2012, he made his senior debut in the fourth round of 2012 Chinese FA Cup against Henan Jianye. Failing to establish himself within the first team, Tu was loaned to China League Two side Meizhou Hakka in 2013 and China League One side Guangdong Sunray Cave in 2014. Tu moved to Meizhou Hakka on free transfer in January 2015. 

Tu joined Chinese Super League side Guangzhou R&F in February 2016. He played for Guangzhou R&F reserve team in the 2016 season. Tu was loaned to Hong Kong Premier League side R&F, which was the satellite team of Guangzhou R&F, in February 2017. He made his debut on 18 February 2017 in a 4–3 away win against Hong Kong FC. He was appointed as team captain in late February after Min Junlin left the club. Tu terminated his contract with the club in the summer of 2017.

Tu signed for China League Two side Meixian Techand in July 2017. On 29 July 2017, he scored his first goal for the club in a 3–1 win over Chengdu Qbao. He made 11 appearances and scored once in the 2017 season as Meixian Techand won promotion to the China League One.

Career statistics 
.

Honours

Club
Guangzhou Evergrande
Chinese Super League: 2011, 2012
China League One: 2010
Chinese FA Cup: 2012

References

External links
 

1991 births
Living people
Chinese footballers
Footballers from Guangzhou
Guangzhou F.C. players
Meizhou Hakka F.C. players
Guangdong Sunray Cave players
Guangzhou City F.C. players
R&F (Hong Kong) players
Guangdong South China Tiger F.C. players
Kunshan F.C. players
Association football defenders
Chinese Super League players
China League One players
China League Two players
Hong Kong Premier League players
21st-century Chinese people